Lasse Hjortnæs (born 15 October 1960 in Copenhagen) is a Danish Olympic sailor. He competed in the 1980, 1984, 1988 and 2000 Summer Olympics and finished fifth in the Finn class in the 1988 edition.

References

External links
 
 
 

1960 births
Living people
Danish male sailors (sport)
Olympic sailors of Denmark
Sailors at the 1980 Summer Olympics – Finn
Sailors at the 1984 Summer Olympics – Finn
Sailors at the 1988 Summer Olympics – Finn
Sailors at the 2000 Summer Olympics – Finn
Finn class sailors
Finn class world champions
Laser class sailors
Laser class world champions
World champions in sailing for Denmark
Sportspeople from Copenhagen